Don Lee (born c. 1971) is a former American football player and current head coach at Virginia University of Lynchburg. He served as the head football coach at Belhaven College from 2006 to 2008 and Olivet Nazarene University from 2009 to 2010, compiling a career college football record of 19–52. Lee was the second African American head coach in history of the NAIA's Mid-South Conference and is a recipient of a National Football League minority coach fellowship.

Playing career
Lee played defensive end at Olivet Nazarene University from 1990 until 1993, where he also earned a Bachelor of Science degree in Physical Education in 1995.

Coaching career

Assistant coaching
Lee's coaching career began with Momence High School in Momence, Illinois, where he served as outside linebackers coach for the school. His next move was Middle Georgia College as the defensive ends coach from 1995 to 1997. At Middle Georgia, the defense was ranked seventh in the NJCAA in total defense during the 1995 season.

Lee entered the collegiate coaching ranks as defensive line coach at Southwest Baptist University from 1997 until 2001, and in 2002 moved to be the linebackers coach at the University of the Cumberlands in Kentucky.  His next move was to become an assistant coach at Belhaven, where he would later become the head coach.

Belhaven
Lee was the head football coach at Belhaven College in Jackson, Mississippi from 2006 to 2008. He was the fourth head football coach at the school. His record at Belhaven was 13–20. The team won the Mid-South Conference West Division title in the process.

After several years as an assistant coach, Lee began his tenure at Belhaven by producing only the second winning season in the history of the school's football program in 2006.  
 
Lee has modified the school's approach of bringing in junior college transfer students to play and is focusing on building through new recruits.  He has accented that program by bolstering a junior varsity schedule which encourages incoming freshmen to choose Belhaven through the desire of more playing time.  In 2007, his team Belhaven, produced a 5–6 overall record and averaged 33.7 points and allowed 37.3 per game. His challenges in the 2008 season include overcoming being outscored in the fourth quarter of play and overcoming a four win losing streak to begin the season.

Olivet Nazarene
In December 2008, Lee was hired to serve as head coach of his alma mater Olivet Nazarene in Bourbonnais, Illinois. He resigned after only two seasons in November 2010 and cited family and personal reasons for the resignation. During his two year stint as head coach, Lee led the Tigers to a record of 2–20. Prior to his resignation, Lee notoriously skipped football practice to rake leaves at his home.

Concordia College Alabama
From Olive Nazarene, Lee took an assistant position with Concordia College Alabama. In his first season, the Hornets finished the 2011 season with a 6–5 record, and won their last game against the Division II Stillman. Concordia opened their 2012 season with a 20–19 upset victory over Mississippi Valley State of the Division I FCS. Lee was elevated to head coach of the Hornets after the third game of the 2012 season, after the Shepherd Skanes was fired.

Head coaching record

References

1970s births
Living people
American football defensive ends
Belhaven Blazers football coaches
Concordia College (Alabama) Hornets football coaches
Cumberlands Patriots football coaches
Olivet Nazarene Tigers football coaches
Olivet Nazarene Tigers football players
Southwest Baptist Bearcats football coaches
Virginia–Lynchburg Dragons football coaches
High school football coaches in Illinois
Junior college football coaches in the United States
African-American coaches of American football
African-American players of American football
21st-century African-American sportspeople
20th-century African-American sportspeople